Francesco La Macchia (9 October 1938 – 31 July 2017) was an Italian sprint canoer who won a C-2 1000 m silver medal at the 1960 Summer Olympics in Rome.

References

1938 births
2017 deaths
Canoeists at the 1960 Summer Olympics
Italian male canoeists
Olympic canoeists of Italy
Olympic silver medalists for Italy
Olympic medalists in canoeing
Medalists at the 1960 Summer Olympics
20th-century Italian people
Sportspeople from Messina